Caloreas venusta is a moth in the family Choreutidae. It was described by Walsingham in 1914. It is found in Central America.

References

Natural History Museum Lepidoptera generic names catalog

Choreutidae
Moths described in 1914